This is a list of members of the Victorian Legislative Assembly from 1973 to 1976, as elected at the 1973 state election:

 The Victorian branch of the Country Party changed its name to the National Party during this parliamentary term.
 The result in the electorate of Greensborough was extremely close at the 1973 election, with incumbent Liberal member Monte Vale defeating former Labor member Bob Fell by five votes. Fell appealed to the Court of Disputed Returns, which overturned the result in September. Vale defeated Fell by a larger margin at the resulting by-election on 13 October 1973.
 In February 1975, the Labor member for Brunswick East, David Bornstein, resigned. Labor candidate Ron McAlister won the resulting by-election on 12 April 1975.

Members of the Parliament of Victoria by term
20th-century Australian politicians